Edwardsia delapiae is a species of sea anemone which is currently only known from its type locality in South-West Ireland.

Description
This species of sea anemone has an elongated column; divided into scapus and scapulus. There are 16 tentacles arranged in two equal cycles of 8. The tentacles are transparent, with a white ring at the base and sometimes a little white coloration near the tip. Column up to 80 mm in length when fully extended, span of tentacles to 40 mm.

Range
This sea anemone is currently only known from Valentia harbour, Co. Kerry, Ireland.

Habitat
Edwardsia delapiae lives buried in mud and extends its tentacles across the surface of the substrate.

Etymology
This species was named after its discoverer, Maude Delap.

References

Edwardsia